Fruit Bowl on a Table is a circa 1934 still-life painting by the French artist Pierre Bonnard which was bought by the city of Strasbourg in 1995 from the heiresses of Claude Roger-Marx. Today this painting is in the Musée d'Art moderne et contemporain.

The painting, with its slightly distorted perspective and its contrast of warm colors with dark shadows displays the late Bonnard's characteristic search for new means to depict space. It is one of several still life paintings he created in that decade.

References

Paintings by Pierre Bonnard
Paintings in the collection of the Strasbourg Museum of Modern and Contemporary Art
Still life paintings
1934 paintings
Post-impressionist paintings
Grape
Apples
Oil on canvas paintings